Major poetry related events which took place worldwide during 2018 are outlined below under different sections. This includes poetry books released during the year in different languages, major literary awards, poetry festivals and events, besides anniversaries and deaths of renowned poets etc. Nationality words link to articles with information on the nation's poetry or literature (for instance, India or France).

Events
 August 11 – Writer V. S. Naipaul, on his deathbed in London, is read Tennyson's poem "Crossing the Bar" by newspaper editor Geordie Greig.

Anniversaries

Selection of works published in English

Australia
 Jordie Albiston, Warlines
 Judith Beveridge, Sun Music: New and Selected Poems
 Ken Bolton, Starting at Basheer's
 Sarah Day, Towards Light & Other Poems
 Paul Hetherington, Moonlight on Oleander 
 John Mateer, João
 Tim Metcalf, The Underwritten Plain
 Tracy Ryan, The Water Bearer

Canada
 Gwen Benaway, Holy Wild
 Leonard Cohen (d. 2016), The Flame

Anthologies in Canada

New Zealand

Poets in Best New Zealand Poems

United Kingdom

England
 Raymond Antrobus, The Perseverance
 Jay Bernard, Surge
 John Cooper Clarke, The Luckiest Guy Alive
 Salena Godden, Pessimism is for Lightweights: 13 pieces of courage and resistance
 Susannah Hart, Out of True
 Zaffar Kunial, Us
 Andrew McMillan, playtime
 J. O. Morgan, Assurances (Scottish poet published in England)
 Robin Robertson, The Long Take (novel partly in verse; Scottish poet published in England)
 Richard Scott, Soho
 Hannah Sullivan, Three Poems

Northern Ireland

Scotland

Anthologies in the United Kingdom
 Fiona Waters, I am the Seed that Grew the Tree: A Nature Poem for Every Day of the Year

Criticism, scholarship and biography in the United Kingdom

United States
Alphabetical listing by author name
Elizabeth Acevedo, The Poet X (young adult verse novel)
Ace Allen, Poems of People
Jos Charles, feeld (Milkweed Editions)
Jason Reynolds, For Every One

Anthologies in the United States

Criticism, scholarship and biography in the United States

Poets in The Best American Poetry 2018

Works published in other languages

Italian

 AA.VV., Paragrafi. Antologia di poesia in prosa (edited by Pietro Montorfani, Coll. Candide, Pasturana, puntoacapo editrice), poets: Antonella Anedda, Marta Arnaldi, Daniela Attanasio, Alberto Bertoni, Franco Buffoni, Pietro De Marchi, Luigi Fontanella, Marco Furia, Vito Giuliana, Andrea Inglese, Gilberto Isella, Fabio Jermini, Marica Larocchi, Franca Mancinelli, Massimiliano Mandorlo, Matteo Munaretto, Giampiero Neri, Alberto Nessi, Enzo Pelli, Giancarlo Pontiggia, Fabio Pusterla, Jacopo Ramonda, Roberto Rossi Precerutti, Marco Sonzogni, Andrea Temporelli, Marco Vitale
 AA.VV., Non era soltanto passione. Generazione degli anni 80 (edited by Andrea Bianchetti, preface by Debora Giampani, Viganello [Lugano], alla chiara fonte); poets: Noé Albergati, Daniele Bernardi, Yari Bernasconi, Andrea Bianchetti, Margherita Coldesina, Laura Di Corcia, Lia Galli, Andrea Grassi, Fabio Jermini, Jonathan Lupi, Mercure Martini, Marko Miladinovic, Pietro Montorfani, Carlotta Silini
 Linda Baranzini, Solo vorrei ammirare lungamente (Viganello [Lugano], alla chiara fonte)

Nepali

Awards and honors by country
See also: List of poetry awards
Awards announced this year:

International
 Struga Poetry Evenings Golden Wreath Laureate:

Australia awards and honors
 C. J. Dennis Prize for Poetry:
 Kenneth Slessor Prize for Poetry:

Canada awards and honors
 Archibald Lampman Award: Christine McNair, Charm
 J. M. Abraham Poetry Award: Julia McCarthy, All the Names Between
 Governor General's Awards: Cecily Nicholson, Wayside Sang (English); Michaël Trahan, La raison des fleurs (French)
 Griffin Poetry Prize:
Canada: Billy-Ray Belcourt, This Wound Is a World
International: Susan Howe, Debths
Lifetime Recognition Award (presented by the Griffin trustees): Ana Blandiana
 Latner Writers' Trust Poetry Prize: Jordan Scott
 Gerald Lampert Award: Emily Nilsen, Otolith
 Pat Lowther Award: Lesley Belleau, Indianland
 Prix Alain-Grandbois: Catherine Lalonde, La dévoration des fées
 Raymond Souster Award: Karen Enns, Cloud Physics
 Dorothy Livesay Poetry Prize: Mercedes Eng, Prison Industrial Complex Explodes
 Prix Émile-Nelligan:

France awards and honors
Prix Goncourt de la Poésie:

New Zealand awards and honors
 Prime Minister's Awards for Literary Achievement:
 Fiction: 
 Nonfiction: 
 Poetry: 
 Mary and Peter Biggs Award for Poetry : Elizabeth Smither, Night Horse

United Kingdom awards and honors
 Cholmondeley Award: Vahni Capildeo, Kate Clanchy, Linton Kwesi Johnson, Daljit Nagra, Zoë Skoulding
 Costa Award (formerly "Whitbread Awards") for poetry: 
 Shortlist: Zaffar Kunial, Us; J. O. Morgan, Assurances; Richard Scott, Soho; Hannah Sullivan, Three Poems
 English Association's Fellows' Poetry Prizes:
 Eric Gregory Award (for a collection of poems by a poet under the age of 30):
 Forward Poetry Prize:
Best Collection: 
Shortlist: 
Best First Collection:
Shortlist: 
Best Poem:
Shortlist:
 Jerwood Aldeburgh First Collection Prize for poetry:
Shortlist:
 Manchester Poetry Prize:
 National Poet of Wales: Ifor ap Glyn
 National Poetry Competition 2018:
 Queen's Gold Medal for Poetry: Simon Armitage
 T. S. Eliot Prize (United Kingdom and Ireland): Hannah Sullivan, Three Poems
Shortlist (announced in November 2018): 2018 Short List
 The Times / Stephen Spender Prize for Poetry Translation:

United States awards and honors
 Arab American Book Award (The George Ellenbogen Poetry Award):
Honorable Mentions: 
 Agnes Lynch Starrett Poetry Prize:
 Anisfield-Wolf Book Award: 
 Best Translated Book Award (BTBA):
 Beatrice Hawley Award from Alice James Books:
 Bollingen Prize: 
 Jackson Poetry Prize: 
 Lambda Literary Award:
 Gay Poetry: 
 Lesbian Poetry: 
 Lenore Marshall Poetry Prize: Craig Morgan Teicher
 Los Angeles Times Book Prize: 
Finalists: 
 National Book Award for Poetry (NBA):
NBA Finalists:
NBA Longlist: 
NBA Judges: 
 National Book Critics Circle Award for Poetry: 
 The New Criterion Poetry Prize: 
 Pulitzer Prize for Poetry (United States): 
 Wallace Stevens Award: 
 Whiting Awards: 
 PEN Award for Poetry in Translation: 
 PEN Center USA 2018 Poetry Award: 
 PEN/Voelcker Award for Poetry:                     
 Raiziss/de Palchi Translation Award:
 Ruth Lilly Poetry Prize: 
 Kingsley Tufts Poetry Award: 
 Walt Whitman Prize –         – Judge: 
 Yale Younger Series:

From the Poetry Society of America
 Frost Medal: Ron Padgett
 Shelley Memorial Award: Ntozake Shange
 Writer Magazine/Emily Dickinson Award:
 Lyric Poetry Award:
 Alice Fay Di Castagnola Award: Victoria Chang
 Louise Louis/Emily F. Bourne Student Poetry Award: 
 George Bogin Memorial Award: 
 Robert H. Winner Memorial Award: 
 Cecil Hemley Memorial Award:
 Norma Farber First Book Award: Eve L. Ewing
 Lucille Medwick Memorial Award: 
 William Carlos Williams Award: Jennifer Chang

Deaths

January – June
Birth years link to the corresponding "[year] in poetry" article:

 January 3 – Keorapetse Kgositsile (b. 1938), South African Poet Laureate
 February 12 – Kamal al-Hadithi (b. 1939), Iraqi poet

July – December
 August 5 – Matthew Sweeney (b. 1952), Irish poet
 October 22 – Anne Fairbairn, (b. 1928), Australian poet, journalist and expert in Arab culture
 October 27 – Ntozake Shange (b. 1948), American playwright and poet 
 November 22 – Judith Rodriguez, (b. 1936), Australian poet and academic

See also

 Poetry
 List of years in poetry
 List of poetry awards

References

2010s in poetry
2018 poems
 
2018-related lists
Culture-related lists by year